Lars Eriksson (born 1970) is a Swedish politician and former member of the Riksdag, the national legislature. A member of the Social Democratic Party, he represented Västmanland County between October 2012 and March 2018. He had been a substitute member of the Riksdag for Sven-Erik Österberg in October 2006.

References

1970 births
Living people
Members of the Riksdag 2010–2014
Members of the Riksdag 2014–2018
Members of the Riksdag from the Social Democrats